Berners A. W. Jackson (3 February 1916 – 9 October 2003) was a British Shakespeare scholar who organised  the Shakespeare Seminar at the Stratford Festival between 1961 and 1976. He also edited the Stratford Papers.

Early life
Berners Jackson was born in London on 3 February 1916. He received his BA from McMaster University in 1939 and his D.Phil. from the University of Oxford in 1956 for a thesis titled "The concept of honour in Elizabethan and early Stuart times".

Career
Jackson taught at the English department of McMaster University between 1956 and 1981. He organised the Shakespeare Seminar of the Stratford Festival (Stratford, Ontario) held from 1961 and 1976 and edited the Stratford Papers on William Shakespeare. He also edited the Pelican edition of The Two Gentlemen of Verona in 1964 and the revised edition in 1980, and the Macmillan Canada edition of  Antony and Cleopatra published in 1968.

In 2000 he donated a collection of his papers to the archives of McMaster University.

Selected publications
 "Shakespeare at Stratford, Ontario, 1971", Shakespeare Quarterly, Vol. 22 (1971), pp. 369–370. 
 Manner and Meaning in Shakespeare. McMaster University Library Press & Irish University Press, 1970. (editor)  
 Shakespeare in the New World. McMaster University Library Press, 1972. (editor)

References 

1916 births
2003 deaths
Shakespearean scholars
Academics from London
McMaster University alumni
Alumni of the University of Oxford
Academic staff of McMaster University
British emigrants to Canada